Sakimay 74 is an Indian reserve of the Zagime Anishinabek in Saskatchewan. It is 16 kilometres northwest of Broadview. In the 2016 Canadian Census, it recorded a population of 147 living in 46 of its 170 total private dwellings. In the same year, its Community Well-Being index was calculated at 52 of 100, compared to 58.4 for the average First Nations community and 77.5 for the average non-Indigenous community.

References

Indian reserves in Saskatchewan
Division No. 5, Saskatchewan